Gare de La Roche-sur-Yon is a railway station serving the town La Roche-sur-Yon, Vendée department, western France.

History 
Opened in 1866, the station was originally called Napoléon-Vendée by the Compagnie des chemins de fer de la Vendée. Both ownership and operations have since been transferred to SNCF.

Services

The following services currently call at La Roche-sur-Yon:
TGV services Paris-Montparnasse - Les Sables d'Olonne
Intercity services (Intercités) Nantes - La Rochelle - Bordeaux
TER Pays de la Loire services
Line 8 Nantes - Les Sables d'Olonne
Line 9 Nantes - La Rochelle
Line 14 La Roche-sur-Yon - Saumur

References

Railway stations in Vendée
Railway stations in France opened in 1866